Brachytrupes is a genus of mostly African crickets in the family Gryllidae.

Species
Brachytrupes calaharicus (Karny, 1910) 
Brachytrupes chopardi (Uvarov, 1922)
Brachytrupes grandidieri (Saussure, 1877) 
Brachytrupes megacephalus (Lefèvre, 1827) 
Brachytrupes membranaceus (Drury, 1773) - type species (as Gryllus membranaceus Drury = B. membranaceus membranaceus)
Brachytrupes politus (Bolivar, I., 1890) 
Brachytrupes testaceus (Karny, 1910)

Note: "Brachytrupes portentosus" (Lichtenstein AAH, 1796) is a synonym of Tarbinskiellus portentosus: found in Asia.

References

Gryllinae
Orthoptera genera
Taxa named by Jean Guillaume Audinet-Serville
Insect pests of millets